An election was held on November 3, 2020 to elect 25 members to Montana's Senate. The election coincided with elections for other offices, including the Presidency, U.S Senate, U.S. House of Representatives, Governorship, and state house. The primary election was held on June 2, 2020

Predictions

Results summary 
Summary of the November 3, 2020 Montana Senate election results

Close races
Districts where the margin of victory was under 10%:
District 38, 0.44%
District 39, 1.64%
District 25, 3.27%
District 26, 5.1% gain
District 47, 9.28%

Incumbents defeated in the primary election
Tom Richmond (R-District 28), defeated by Brad Molnar (R)

Incumbents defeated in the general election
Margaret MacDonald (D-District 26), defeated by Chris Friedel (R)

Summary of results by State Senate District

Detailed Results

Districts 2–25

District 2
Incumbent Republican Dee Brown has represented the 2nd district since 2013. Brown was term-limited and couldn't seek re-election. State Representative Carl Glimm won the open seat.

District 3
Incumbent Republican Keith Regier has represented the 3rd district since 2017.

District 6
Incumbent Republican Albert Olszewski has represented the 6th district since 2017. Olszewski unsuccessfully sought the Republican nomination for Governor. Term-limited state representative and state House Speaker Greg Hertz won the open seat.

District 7
Incumbent Republican Jennifer Fielder has represented the 7th district since 2013. Fielder was term-limited and ran successfully for a seat on the Montana Public Service Commission.

District 10
Incumbent Steve Fitzpatrick has represented the 10th district since 2017.

District 15
Incumbent Republican Ryan Osmundson has represented the 15th district since 2017.

District 16
Incumbent Democrat Frank Smith has represented the 16th district since 2017. Smith chose not to seek re-election, and he instead successfully ran for a seat in the Montana House.

District 17
Incumbent Republican Mike Lang has represented the 17th district since 2017.

District 18
Incumbent Republican Steve Hinebauch has represented the 18th district since 2017.

District 21
Incumbent Republican Jason Small has represented the 21st district since 2017.

District 23
Incumbent Republican Roger Webb has represented the 23rd district since 2013. Webb was term-limited and couldn't seek re-election. Former state representative Tom McGillvray won the open seat.

District 25
Incumbent Democrat Jen Gross has represented the 25th district since 2017.

Districts 26–47

District 26
Incumbent Democrat Margaret MacDonald has represented the 26th district since 2017. She ran for re-election to a 2nd term, but was defeated by Republican Chris Friedel.

District 28
Incumbent Republican Tom Richmond has represented the 28th district since 2017. Former Public Service Commissioner and state representative Brad Molnar defeated Richmond in the Republican primary.

District 31
Incumbent Democrat Mike Phillips has represented the 31st district since 2013. Phillips was term-limited and couldn't seek re-election. State Representative Christopher Pope won the open seat.

District 35
Incumbent Republican Scott Sales has represented the 35th district and its predecessors since 2013. Sales was term-limited and couldn't seek re-election, he instead ran Secretary of State.

District 36
Incumbent Republican Jeffrey Welborn has represented the 36th district since 2017.

District 37
Incumbent Democrat Minority Leader Jon Sesso has represented the 37th district since 2013. Sesso was term-limited and couldn't seek re-election.

District 38
Incumbent Democrat Edith McClafferty has represented the 38th district since 2017.

District 39
Incumbent Democrat Gene Vuckovich has represented the 39th district since 2011. Vuckovich was term-limited and couldn't seek re-election.

District 40
Incumbent Republican Terry Gauthier has represented the 40th district since 2017.

District 44
Incumbent Republican Majority Leader Fred Thomas has represented the 44th district since 2013. Thomas was term-limited and couldn't seek re-election. Representative Theresa Manzella won the open seat.

District 45
Incumbent Democrat Dick Barrett has represented the 45th district and its predecessors since 2013. Barrett was term-limited and couldn't seek re-election.

District 46
Incumbent Democrat Sue Malek has represented the 46th district since 2013. Malek was term-limited and couldn't seek re-election.

District 47
Incumbent Republican Dan Salomon has represented the 47th district since 2017.

References

2020 Montana elections
Montana Senate
November 2020 events in the United States
Montana Senate elections